

List
Lansing, Michigan, was incorporated as a city on February 15, 1859.

 Hiram H. Smith, 1859  
 John A. Kerr, 1860 
 William H. Chapman, 1861–62 
 Dr. Ira H. Bartholomew, 1863–65 
 Dr. William H. Haze, 1866 
 George W. Peck, 1867 
 Cyrus Hewitt, 1868–69 
 Dr. Solomon W. Wright, 1870 
 John Robson, 1871 and 1881 
 John S. Tooker, 1872–73 and 1876 
 Daniel W. Buck, 1874–75 and 1886 
 Orlando Mack Barnes, 1877 
 Joseph E. Warner, 1878 
 William Van Buren, 1879–80 
 Orlando F. Barnes, 1882–83 
 William Donovan, 1884–85 
 Jacob F. Schultz, 1887 
 John Crotty, 1888 
 James M. Turner, 1889 and 1895 
 Frank B. Johnson, 1890–91 
 Arthur O. Bement, 1892–93 
 Alroy A. Wilbur, 1894 
 Russell C. Ostrander, 1896 
 Charles J. Davis, 1897–99 
 James F. Hammell, 1900–03
 Hugh Lyons, 1904–07
 John S. Bennett, 1908–11 
 J. Gottlieb Reutter, 1912–17 
 Jacob W. Ferle, 1918–19 and 1922 
 Benjamin A. Kyes, 1920–21 
 Silas F. Main, 1922–23 
 Alfred H. Doughty, 1923–26 
 Laird J. Troyer, 1927–30 
 Peter F. Gray, 1931–32 
 Max A. Templeton, 1933–41 
 Arthur E. Stoppel, 1941 
 Sam Street Hughes, 1941–42 
 Ralph Crego, 1943–61 
 Willard I. Bowerman, Jr., 1961–65 
 Max E. Murninghan, 1965–69 
 Gerald W. Graves, 1969–81 
 Terry John McKane, 1981–92 
 Jim Crawford, 1992–93 
 David Hollister, 1993–2003 
 Antonio Benavides, 2003–2006 
 Virgil Bernero, 2006–2018 
 Andy Schor, 2018-Present

References

Additional sources
 The State Journal newspaper; Lansing, Michigan; April 28, 1955; Centennial Issue; pages C-12 to C-18. 
 Early Lansing History, book by James P. Edmonds, 1944, pages 26–27. 
 Out of a Wilderness: an illustrated history of greater Lansing, book by Justin L. Kestenbaum, 1981, page 184. 
 Lansing and its yesterdays; a compilation of a portion of the historical material published in the seventy-fifth edition of the Lansing State Journal, January 1, 1930; page 133.

External links
 Biographies of mayors 
 Mayor's Office official website 

Lansing
Mayor of Lansing